Fernando de la Mora is a city located in the Central Department, and is part of the metropolitan area of Asunción, in Paraguay. With an estimated of 183,390 inhabitants, the city is the seventh most populated of the country.

The city is divided in two areas: the South area and the North area, with a total surface of 21 square kilometers. It is crossed from North to South by many paved streets and avenues, such as Zavala Cue, Pitiantuta, 10 de Julio, Las Residentas, among others. 

It has a total number of 62 green spaces, a sports center, a football court for national and international games, 20 public schools and about 30 private schools. Among the public schools is the  Colegio Nacional de EMD Dr. Fernando de la Mora, this school has about 3,000 students that assist at morning afternoon or night classes. Currently is the biggest school in the city and it has its own sports center. Another school   the “Dr. Eligio Ayala” School of Infirmary, that provides elementary, basic, and superior education.

Toponymy
The city was once called Zavala Cue. Nowadays it takes its name of Fernando de la Mora, one of the fathers of Paraguayan independence from Spain.

Demography

This city has a population that is 100% urban. It has 183,390 inhabitants in total, 88,591 men and 94,798 women, according to information provided by the National Institute of Statistics. The barrio Kamba Cuá is the home of an Afro-Paraguayan community.

Climate

The climate is hot with a temperature that reaches 40 °C in summer and that in winter drops to 0 °C. The annual average is 22 °C.

History

Fernando de la Mora used to be part of the district of San Lorenzo del Campo Grande and its population dedicated mostly to the farming activity. By then, it was called Zavala Cué and there were plantations of vegetables and fruit trees, as well as breeding of farm animals. This activity was oriented to satisfy the necessities of Asunción.

It was called Zavala Cué because in the area was settled an important state belonging a family of last name Zavala. This establishment was part of a group of 10 great states in the area.

The population of Zavala Cué kept growing and the authorities of San Lorenzo did not manifest interest in supporting the development of the city, which made the population very unhappy, so they decided to transform it into a competitive and progressive city.

Then, thanks to the neighbors’ organization an independent municipality was created. The request was granted in 1939 by the government of Félix Paiva, on February 28.
Since 1950, Fernando de la Mora is an independent district of the Central Department, which now has 18 districts. This city is today called “The city of the new millennia”.

Economy

This city has a large commercial sector; practically nothing is left of the old farming community. Today there are many small and medium industries, especially those that work in the metallurgic and chemical sector.

Fernando de la Mora has become a dormitory town as many commute to work in Asunción.

Art and culture

Fernando de la Mora has a modern Municipal Theatre located in the center of the city. This important cultural center is place for numerous events of art in Paraguay. The Municipality of Fernando de la Mora promotes the development of culture with classes of artistic education.

As part of the popular religion, this city celebrates the festivity in honor to the Miraculous Medal every September 27. Another special date is January 6, day of Saint Baltazar, celebrated by the Afro-Paraguayan community.

An historical museum is located in one of the oldest houses in the city, right next to the Municipality building. There are exhibit more than 1300 objects and 100 photographs of the Paraguayan War and the Chaco War. The museum offers guided visits and historical texts specially elaborated for the students and other visitors.

Main sights
Fernando de la Mora has several places of touristic interest. Among them are the neighborhood “6 de Enero” in which are settled the descendants of the first population of African origin that arrived in Paraguay with Gervasio Artigas. This group of people settled in a neighborhood called Loma Campamento de Fernando de la Mora and until today they keep the traditions of their origins. A very interesting thing about them are the dances that clearly have a very distinctive African-American rhythm. These dances are performed in the annual festival organized every January 6 in honor to the  Patron Saint, St. Baltazar. This celebration is called the festivity of “Kamba Cuá”.

Parish Church of the Miraculous Medal

After the foundation of the city Fernando de la Mora on July 19, 1942, started the history of the Parish Church of the Miraculous Medal.

This parish church is the result of the combined work of many people, among is Enrique José Veldman, first priest of the parish church, who destined the First Book of two hundred pages to the baptisms made, that book is still in the church, in the archive, preserved as a historical relic.

The first bell of the church was donated by Teodosia Vda. De Gómez, the images of the passion, ornaments, stations and the sacrarium were donated by the Florentín Peña family, who brought them from Buenos Aires, Argentina, where they were sent to do diplomatic work.

A commission formed in 1938 was in charge of building the new temple twice as big as the previous one. Part of the first altar had to be knocked down to do the enlargement. This work was made by the architect Anderson Castorino. The constructions of a little parish school that still functions started in times of the administration of Priest Di Perna.

Transportation

The city is around 8 kilometers away from Downtown Asunción, through Asunción's Avenida Eusebio Ayala (PY02). Other main avenue/routes are Avenida Mariscal Lopez (D027), Avenida Defensores del Chaco/Madame Lynch (D066) and Avenida Fernando de la Mora (PY01) which connects Asunción with Fernando de la Mora and other cities such as Ypane, Ñemby and Villa Elisa.

Notable residents
Rafael Lovera - professional boxer
Edgar Rolón - Paraguayan footballer

References

 Geografía del Paraguay - Editorial Hispana Paraguay S.R.L.- 1a. Edición 1999 - Asunción Paraguay
 Geografía Ilustrada del Paraguay -  - Distribuidora Arami S.R.L.

External links
 Official website

Populated places in the Central Department